"Heroes" is a song by Swedish singer Måns Zelmerlöw. It was released on 28 February 2015 as a digital download in Sweden. The song was written and composed by Anton Malmberg Hård af Segerstad, Joy Deb and Linnea Deb. On 14 March, the song won Melodifestivalen 2015 and represented Sweden in the Eurovision Song Contest 2015 in Vienna, Austria, which it won. It is the lead single for Zelmerlöw's sixth studio album Perfectly Damaged.

Critical reception
Writing in The Independent, Kiran Moodley compared the song with David Guetta's "Lovers on the Sun", concluding "the resemblance is uncanny." Writing for the same outlet in 2022, Ben Kelly named it 36th best Eurovision-winning song of all time, describing it as "a David Guetta production with slightly underwhelming country-style verses".

Melodifestivalen
Being Zelmerlöw's third participation in the selection, "Heroes" participated in the fourth semi-final of the 2015 Melodifestivalen which was held in Örebro's Conventum Arena on 28 February 2015.

The song was performed last at the fourth semi-final. It directly qualified to the final as it got one of the first two places. Right after the second chance, the running order of the final was revealed with "Heroes" being performed at the sixth position. "Heroes" won the selection with 122 points from the international jury and 166 points from the public, receiving 288 points in total, a record under the current voting system. The entry also beat the second placed song with a record margin of 149 points.

Eurovision success
"Heroes" won the Eurovision Song Contest 2015 with a total of 365 points. It is the third-highest-scoring song in the history of the contest from 1975 to 2015 (and fourth-highest if results from 2016 are converted to the older system). It is also the first winning song, since the introduction of the split jury-televoting system in 2009, that has not won the televoting. "Heroes" defeated a record number of twenty-six other songs in the final, as it was the largest Eurovision Song Contest final ever with 27 participating countries.

"Heroes" received the highest percentage of possible points compared to any other Eurovision winner of the 2010 to 2019 decade.

Track listings

Charts

Weekly charts

Year-end charts

Certifications

Release history

References

External links

Melodifestivalen songs of 2015
Swedish pop songs
English-language Swedish songs
Måns Zelmerlöw songs
Songs written by Anton Hård af Segerstad
Eurovision songs of 2015
Eurovision songs of Sweden
Eurovision Song Contest winning songs
2015 singles
2015 songs
Songs written by Joy Deb
Songs written by Linnea Deb
Number-one singles in Austria
Number-one singles in Greece
Number-one singles in Iceland
Number-one singles in Sweden
Number-one singles in Switzerland
Warner Music Group singles